Continental is an album by the British band Saint Etienne which had original release only in Japan.

It is a compilation that includes previously released material such as the UK hit "He's on the Phone" as well as curios like their cover of the Paul Gardiner/Gary Numan song "Stormtrooper in Drag". Many of the tracks were recorded during the 'wilderness' years of 1996–97 when the band members worked on their separate projects. The remix versions on this album had all appeared on Casino Classics.

As part of the 2009 Saint Etienne back catalogue reissue program, the album has had a UK release for the first time. It also has a Heavenly catalogue number - HVNLP70. The deluxe edition includes four previously unreleased tracks.

Track listing

1997 release

2009 release

Personnel
The liner notes list the album's personnel as follows:

 Saint Etienne - producer (1, 2, 3, 5, 6, 9, 10, 11, 13)
 Gerald Johnson - engineer (1, 5)
 Brian Higgins - additional production and remix (2), special production assistant (7), production and mix (8)
 Mat Gray - additional production and remix (2)
 Ian Catt - engineer (3, 6, 7), producer (9, 12)
 Funk II - engineer (at Trouble on Vinyl) (4)
 Steve Pattan - engineer (at Fourth Wave) (4)
 Psychonauts - additional production and remix (4)
 Steve Rodway - producer (for Nuff Respect Productions) (7)
 Motiv 8 - mix arrangement (7)
 David Whitaker - string arrangement (7)
 Etienne Daho appears courtesy of Virgin France (7)
 PFM (Mike Bolton) - additional production and remix (11)
 Broadcast - additional production and remix (13)

 Yasuharu Konishi, Peter Paphides - sleeve notes
 Martin Magntorn - photograph
 Groovisions - sleeve design
 Tadashi Watanane, Koji Matsuo - translation
 Ryota Fujimura, Kinuno Hiratomi - coordination

References

Saint Etienne (band) compilation albums
1997 compilation albums
Heavenly Recordings compilation albums
House music remix albums
Trip hop compilation albums